Brusturi is a commune in Bihor County, Crișana, Romania with a population of 3,469 people. It is composed of eight villages: Brusturi, Cuieșd (Kövesd), Loranta (Loránta), Orvișele (Orvisel), Păulești (Felsőtótfalu), Picleu (Szóvárhegy), Țigăneștii de Criș (Cigányfalva), and Varasău (Varaszótanya).

The commune lies on the banks of the river Valea Fânețelor.

In 1978, two miners (Ioan Bumb and Petru Lele) discovered dinosaur bones in a bauxite mine at Brusturi (Cornet). The Berriasian bauxite deposits at Cornet have yielded approximately 10,000 bones and bone fragments, mainly from ornithopod dinosaurs and rarer pterosaurs (see: Dinosaurs of Romania).

References 

Brusturi
Localities in Crișana